Hossein Navab (1897–1972) was an Iranian diplomat, who served as foreign minister briefly in 1952.

Career
Navab was a career diplomat. In the 1930s he was second secretary at the Iranian Embassy in London. He served as the consul general of Iran in New York in the 1940s. He was also the ambassador of Iran to the Netherlands. He served as the minister of foreign affairs in the second cabinet of Prime Minister Mohammad Mosaddegh which was announced on 26 July 1952. Navab resigned from office without citing any reason on 9 October 1952, and Hossein Fatemi succeeded him in the post.

References

External links

20th-century diplomats
20th-century Iranian politicians
1897 births
1972 deaths
Ambassadors of Iran to the Netherlands
Foreign ministers of Iran
Burials at Behesht-e Zahra